This is a list of works by the science fiction author Frank Herbert.

Fiction

The Dune series

 Dune: Serial publication: Analog, December 1963 – February 1964 (Part I, as "Dune World"), and January – May 1965 (Parts II and III, as "The Prophet of Dune"). First edition: Philadelphia: Chilton Books, 1965.
 Dune Messiah: Serial publication: Galaxy, July – November 1969. First edition: New York: G.P. Putnam's Sons, 1969.
 Children of Dune: Serial publication: Analog, January – April 1976, "Children of Dune". First edition: New York: G.P. Putnam's Sons, 1976.
 God Emperor of Dune, New York: G.P. Putnam's Sons, 1981.
 Heretics of Dune, New York: G.P. Putnam's Sons, 1984.
 Chapterhouse: Dune, New York: G.P. Putnam's Sons, 1985.
 "The Road to Dune" (short story collected in Eye)

The Pandora Sequence (also known as the WorShip series) 
 Destination: Void: Serial publication: Galaxy, August 1965, as "Do I Wake or Dream?" First edition: New York: Berkeley, 1966 revised in 1978.
 The Jesus Incident (with Bill Ransom): Serial publication: Analog, February 1979, G.P. Putnam's Sons, 1979.
 The Lazarus Effect (with Bill Ransom), New York: G.P. Putnam's Sons, 1983.
 The Ascension Factor (with Bill Ransom), New York: G.P. Putnam's Sons, 1988.

The ConSentiency series 

 "A Matter of Traces" (1958): short story collected in Eye
 "The Tactful Saboteur": short story collected in Eye
 Whipping Star (1970): Serial publication: Worlds of If, January – April 1970. First edition: New York: G.P. Putnam's Sons, 1970.
 The Dosadi Experiment: Serial publication: Galaxy, May – August 1977 "The Dosadi Experiment". First edition: New York: G.P. Putnam's Sons, 1977.

Standalone novels 
 The Dragon in the Sea: Serial publication: Astounding, November 1955 – January 1956. First edition: New York: Doubleday, 1956. Also titled Under Pressure and 21st Century Sub. 
 The Green Brain: Serial publication: Amazing, March 1965, under the title "Greenslaves." First edition: New York: Ace, 1966.
 The Eyes of Heisenberg: Serial publication: Galaxy, June – August 1966, as "Heisenberg's Eyes." First edition: New York: Berkeley, 1966.
 The Heaven Makers: Serial publication: Amazing, April – June 1967. First edition: New York: Avon, 1968
 The Santaroga Barrier: Serial publication: Amazing, October 1967 – February 1968. First edition: New York: Berkeley, 1968
 Soul Catcher, New York: G.P. Putnam's Sons, 1972.
 The Godmakers: Serial publication: "You Take the High Road", Astounding, May 1958, "Missing Link", Astounding, February 1959, "Operation Haystack", Astounding, May 1959 and "The Priests of Psi" Fantastic, February 1960. First edition: New York: G.P. Putnam's Sons, 1972.
 Hellstrom's Hive: Serial publication: Galaxy, November 1972 – March 1973, "Project 40." First edition: New York: Doubleday, 1973.
 Direct Descent: Serial publication: Astounding, December 1954, "Packrat Planet". First edition: New York: Ace Books, 1980.
 The White Plague, New York: G.P. Putnam's Sons, 1982.
 Man of Two Worlds (with Brian Herbert), New York: G.P. Putnam's Sons, 1986.
 High-Opp: WordFire Press, 2012.
 Angels' Fall: WordFire Press, 2013.
 A Game of Authors: WordFire Press, 2013.
 A Thorn in the Bush: WordFire Press, 2014.

Short fiction collections 
 The Worlds of Frank Herbert, London: New English Library, 1970.
 The Book of Frank Herbert, New York: DAW Books, 1973.
 The Best of Frank Herbert, London: Sidgwick & Jackson, 1975.
 The Priests of Psi, London: Gollancz Ltd, 1980.
 Eye (Jim Burns, illustrator), New York: Berkeley, 1985.
 The Collected Stories of Frank Herbert, New York: Tor Books, 2014.
 Unpublished Stories, WordFire Press, 2016.

Short fiction 

 "Survival of the Cunning," Esquire, March 1945.
 "The Jonah and the Jap," Doc Savage, April 1946.
 "Yellow Fire," Alaska Life (Alaska Territorial Magazine), June 1947.
 "Looking for Something?" Startling Stories, April 1952.
 "Operation Syndrome," Astounding, June 1954. also in T.E. Dikty's Best Science Fiction Stories and Novels, 1955 series
 "The Gone Dogs," Amazing, November 1954.
 "Packrat Planet," Astounding, December 1954.
 "Rat Race," Astounding, July 1955.
 "Occupation Force," Fantastic, August 1955.
 "The Nothing," Fantastic Universe, January 1956.
 "Cease Fire," Astounding, January 1956.
 "Old Rambling House," Galaxy, April 1958.
 "You Take the High Road," Astounding, May 1958.
 "A Matter of Traces," Fantastic Universe, November 1958.
 "Missing Link," Astounding, February 1959. also in Author's Choice, ed. Harry Harrison, New York: Berkeley, 1968.
 "Operation Haystack," Astounding, May 1959.
 "The Priests of Psi," Fantastic, February 1960.
 "Egg and Ashes," Worlds of If, November 1960.
 "A-W-F Unlimited", Galaxy, June 1961.
 "Try to Remember," Amazing, October 1961.
 "Mating Call", Galaxy, October 1961.
 "Mindfield," Amazing, March 1962.
 "The Mary Celeste Move," Analog, October 1964.
 "The Tactful Saboteur," Galaxy, October 1964.
 "Greenslaves," Amazing, March 1965.
 "Committee of the Whole", Galaxy, April 1965.
 "The GM Effect," Analog, June 1965.
 "Do I Wake or Dream?" Galaxy, August 1965.
 "The Primitives", Galaxy, April 1966.
 "Escape Felicity," Analog, June 1966.
 "By the Book," Analog, August 1966.
 "The Featherbedders," Analog, August 1967.
 "The Mind Bomb" (aka "The Being Machine"), Worlds of If, October 1969.
 "Seed Stock," Analog, April 1970.
 "Murder Will In," The Magazine of Fantasy and Science Fiction, May 1970.
 "Project 40" (three installments) (novelized as "Hellstrom's Hive"), Galaxy, November 1972 – March 1973.
 "Encounter in a Lonely Place," The Book of Frank Herbert, New York: DAW Books, 1973.
 "Gambling Device," The Book of Frank Herbert New York, DAW Books, 1973.
 "Passage for Piano," The Book of Frank Herbert New York, DAW Books, 1973.
 "The Death of a City," Future City, ed. Roger Elwood. Trident Press: New York, 1973.
 "Come to the Party" with F. M. Busby, Analog, December 1978.
 "Songs of a Sentient Flute," Analog, February 1979. (Ghost written by Bill Ransom)
 "Frogs and Scientists," Destinies, Ace Books, August–September 1979.
 "Feathered Pigs," Destinies, Ace Books, October–December 1979.
 "The Road to Dune," Eye, New York: Berkeley 1985.
 "The Daddy Box", The Collected Stories of Frank Herbert, New York: Tor 2014.
 "The Yellow Coat", Fiction River: Pulse Pounders, WMG Publishing 2015.
 "The Cage", Unpublished Stories, WordFire Press, 2016.
 "The Illegitimate Stage", Unpublished Stories, WordFire Press, 2016.
 "A Lesson in History", Unpublished Stories, WordFire Press, 2016.
 "Wilfred", Unpublished Stories, WordFire Press, 2016.
 "The Iron Maiden", Unpublished Stories, WordFire Press, 2016.
 "The Wrong Cat", Unpublished Stories, WordFire Press, 2016.
 "The Heat's On", Unpublished Stories, WordFire Press, 2016.
 "The Little Window", Unpublished Stories, WordFire Press, 2016.
 "The Waters of Kan-E", Unpublished Stories, WordFire Press, 2016.
 "Paul's Friend", Unpublished Stories, WordFire Press, 2016.
 "Public Hearing", Unpublished Stories, WordFire Press, 2016.

Nonfiction

Nonfiction books 
 New World or No World (editor), New York: Ace Books, 1970 (paper).
 Threshold: The Blue Angels Experience, New York: Ballantine, 1973 (paper). Companion to documentary of same name about Blue Angels flight team.
 Nebula Winners Fifteen (editor), New York: Harper & Row, 1981 (hardcover).
 Without Me, You're Nothing (with Max Barnard), New York: Pocket Books, 1981 (hardcover).
 The Maker of Dune: insights of a master of science fiction, New York, Berkley Books, 1987 (paper). Edited by Tim O'Reilly.
 The Home Computer Handbook, Frank Herbert, Max Barnard - Ed.: Gollancz, 1981, 297 pag. - .

Essays and introductions 
 Introduction to Saving Worlds, by Roger Elwood and Virginia Kidd. New York: Doubleday, 1973. Reissued by Bantam Books as The Wounded Planet.
 "Introduction: Tomorrow's Alternatives?" in Frontiers 1: Tomorrow's Alternatives, ed. Roger Elwood. New York: Macmillan, 1973.
Reprinted as "Doll Factory, Gun Factory" in The Maker of Dune.
 Introduction to Tomorrow and Tomorrow and Tomorrow. Heitz, Herbert, Joor McGee. New York: Holt, Rinehart and Winston, 1973.
 "Listening to the Left Hand", Harper's Magazine, December 1973, pp. 92 – 100.
 "Science Fiction and a World Crisis" in Science Fiction: Today and Tomorrow, ed. Reginald Bretnor. New York: Harper and Row, 1974.
 "Men on Other Planets", The Craft of Science Fiction, ed. Reginald Bretnor. New York: Harper and Row, 1976.
 "The Sky is Going to Fall", in Seriatim: The Journal of Ecotopia, No. 2, Spring 1977, pp. 88 – 89. (slightly different article appeared in The San Francisco Examiner "Overview" column, July 4, 1976.)
 "The ConSentiency and How it Got That Way", Galaxy, May 1977 (may be considered as a fiction story and therefore in the "Original Single Story" section)
 "Dune Genesis", Omni, July 1980.

Significant newspaper articles 
 "Flying Saucers: Fact or Farce?", San Francisco Sunday Examiner & Chronicle, people supplement, October 20, 1963.
 "2068 A.D.", San Francisco Sunday Examiner & Chronicle, California Living section, July 28, 1968.
 "We're Losing the Smog War" (part 1). San Francisco Sunday Examiner & Chronicle, California Living section, December 1, 1968.
 "Lying to Ourselves About Air" (part 2). San Francisco Sunday Examiner & Chronicle, California Living section, December 8, 1968.
 "You Can Go Home Again." San Francisco Sunday Examiner & Chronicle, California Living section, March 29, 1970. (Refers to some of Herbert's childhood experiences in the Northwest)
 "Overview," San Francisco Sunday Examiner & Chronicle, July 4, 1976.
 "New Lifestyle to Fit a World of Shortages." San Francisco Sunday Examiner & Chronicle, March 25, 1977

Other publications

Poetry
 "Carthage: Reflections of a Martian", Mars, We Love You, ed. Jane Hipolito and Willis E. McNelly. New York: Doubleday, 1971.

Audio recordings
 Sandworms of Dune, New York: Caedmon Records, 1978.
 Dune: The Banquet Scene, New York: Caedmon Records, 1979.
 The Battles of Dune, New York: Caedmon Records, 1979.
 The Truths of Dune "Fear is the Mindkiller", New York: Caedmon Records, 1979.

Interviews
 Interviews with Frank Herbert, Vertex, 1973, 1977. 
 The Plowboy interview Frank Herbert, The Mother Earth News, May 1981.
 The Willis E. McNelly Interview with Frank Herbert, February 1969.

References

Bibliographies by writer
 
Bibliographies of American writers
Science fiction bibliographies
Fantasy bibliographies